The 2002 San Francisco Board of Supervisors elections occurred on November 5, 2002, with runoff elections held on December 10, 2002. Five of the eleven seats were contested in this election. Three incumbents ran for reelection, while two sought another office.

Municipal elections in California are officially non-partisan, though most candidates in San Francisco do receive funding and support from various political parties. This was the last Board of Supervisors election in San Francisco to use the two-round system of elections.


Results

District 2 

District 2 consists of the Marina, Pacific Heights, the Presidio, part of Russian Hill, and Sea Cliff. Incumbent supervisor Gavin Newsom ran for reelection.

District 4 

District 4 consists primarily of the Sunset district. Incumbent supervisor Leland Yee did not seek reelection, instead running for a seat in the California State Assembly.

District 6 

District 6 consists of Alcatraz Island, Civic Center, Mission Bay, South of Market, the Tenderloin, Treasure Island, and Yerba Buena Island. Incumbent supervisor Chris Daly ran for reelection.

District 8 

District 8 consists of The Castro, Diamond Heights, Duboce Triangle, Eureka Valley, Glen Park, and Noe Valley. Incumbent supervisor Mark Leno did not seek reelection, instead running for a seat in the California State Assembly.

District 10 

District 10 consists of Bayview-Hunters Point, McLaren Park, part of the Portola, Potrero Hill, and Visitacion Valley. Incumbent supervisor Sophie Maxwell ran for reelection unopposed.

References

External links 
San Francisco Department of Elections

San Francisco Board of Supervisors
Elections Board of Supervisors
San Francisco Board of Supervisors
Board of Supervisors 2002